Central Kalapuyan was a Kalapuyan language indigenous to the central and southern Willamette Valley in Oregon in the United States. It was spoken by various bands of the Kalapuya peoples who inhabited the valley up through the middle of the 19th century. The language is closely related to Northern Kalapuya, spoken in the Tualatin and Yamhill valleys. Dialects of Central Kalapuya that have been identified include:

Ahantchuyuk dialect, spoken in the northeastern Willamette Valley along the Pudding and Molalla rivers
Santiam dialect, spoken in the central Willamette Valley along the lower Santiam River
Luckiamute dialect, spoken in the central Willamette Valley along the Luckiamute River
Chepenafa dialect, spoken in the central Willamette Valley along Marys River
Chemapho dialect, spoken in the central Willamette Valley along Muddy Creek
Chelamela dialect, spoken in the southwestern Willamette Valley along the Long Tom River
Tsankupi dialect, spoken in the southeastern Willamette Valley along the Calapooia River
Winefelly-Mohawk dialects, spoken in the southeastern Willamette Valley along the McKenzie, Mohawk, and Coast Fork Willamette rivers

Phonology

The phonology of the Santiam dialect, as described by Jacobs (1945) and analyzed by Banks (2007), is listed below.  Banks notes that Jacobs' analysis does not rigorously account for allophonic variation, and that, according to Jacobs, there may have been some interchangeability between the velar and uvular series.

Consonants

The nasals [m] and [n] likely had syllabic forms: [m̩] and [n̩]. Jacobs possibly notes that the plosives also have voiced allophones, as [b], [d], [ɡ], [ɡʷ], [ɢ], and [ɢʷ]. Banks also notes that /h/, /hʷ/, /dz/, /dʒ/, and /ɸʷ/ may have been allophones.

Vowels

Santiam Kalapuya had three diphthongs: [ai], [au], and [ui].  Vowel length may have been phonemic, /ɔ/ may have been an allophone of /u/.

References

External links
 The Verbal Morphology of Santiam Kalapuya (Northwest Journal of Linguistics)

Kalapuyan languages
Indigenous languages of Oregon
Indigenous languages of the Pacific Northwest Coast
Willamette Valley
Extinct languages of North America
Languages extinct in the 1950s
1954 disestablishments in Oregon
Native American history of Oregon